The 1924–25 season was Aberdeen's 20th season in the top flight of Scottish football and their 21st season overall. The club competed in Scottish Football League Division One and Scottish Cup in season 1924–25.

Overview

Aberdeen began the 1924–25 season with their second manager in charge, after Jimmy Philip resigned in the summer. Former player Paddy Travers was appointed as the new manager. Aberdeen finished 15th in Division One, just two points clear of relegation. In the Scottish Cup, they lost in the fourth round to Hamilton Academical at Pittodrie.

Results

Scottish Division One

Final standings

Scottish Cup

Squad

Appearances & Goals

|}

References

Aberdeen F.C. seasons
Aberdeen